Einar Axelsson (February 25, 1895–October 30, 1971) was a Swedish stage and film actor.

Biography
Einar Rickard Axelsson was born at Lund in Skåne, Sweden.  He was the son of actors Konstantin and Amelie Axelsson. He was the brother of journalist George Axelsson (1898–1966). After playing at the Folkteatern in Gothenburg (1913–1914), he  joined the theater company of Karin Swanström  which was active until the early 1920s. From 1925 to 1941, Axelsson was one of the leading names in  various theater companies associated with Ernst Eklund.  He died at Stocksund in Stockholm and was buried at Danderyds kyrkogård in Stockholm.

Selected filmography
 The Phantom Carriage (1921)
 Thomas Graal's Ward (1922)
 The Girl in Tails (1926)
 Getting Married (1926)
The Poetry of Ådalen (1928)
 Black Roses (1932)
 The Love Express (1932)
 Marriageable Daughters (1933)
 Eva Goes Aboard (1934)
 Kanske en gentleman (1935)
 The Marriage Game (1935)
 The Ghost of Bragehus (1936)
 Happy Vestköping (1937)
 Witches' Night (1937)
 Hanna in Society (1940)
 A Crime (1940)
 Magistrarna på sommarlov (1941)
 Fransson the Terrible (1941)
 Lyckan kommer (1942)
 We House Slaves (1942)
 It Is My Music (1942)
 The Emperor of Portugallia (1944)
 Between Brothers (1946)
 Iris and the Lieutenant (1947)
 Sunshine (1948)
 Simon the Sinner (1954)
 The Girl in Tails (1956)
 A Doll's House (1956)
 The Great Amateur (1958)
 We at Väddö (1958)
 More Than a Match for the Navy (1958)
 A Goat in the Garden (1958)

References

Bibliography 
 Tommy Gustafsson. Masculinity in the Golden Age of Swedish Cinema: A Cultural Analysis of 1920s Films. McFarland, 2014.

External links

1895 births
1971 deaths
People from Lund
Swedish male film actors
Swedish male silent film actors
Swedish male stage actors
20th-century Swedish male actors